The News Evening Post, or Xinwen Wanbao, also known as Xinwen Evening News or Shanghai Evening News or Shanghai Evening Post, was a Shanghai-based Chinese-language metropolitan evening newspaper published in China.  

News Evening Post was officially launched on 1 January 1999 and was part of the Jiefang Daily Press Group (解放日报报业集团).

History
News Evening Post was formally founded on January 1, 1999. On January 1, 2014, it officially ceased publication.

References

Defunct newspapers published in China
Publications established in 1999
1999 establishments in China
Publications disestablished in 2014